Arancón is a municipality in the  province of Soria, Spain, located at the foot of the mountain range of El Almuerzo and Mount Cencejo. The localities that form it are Arancón, Tozalmoro, Omeñaca, Calderuela, Nieva de Calderuela and Cortos.

Main sights
Roman road: Via 27 of Antonino, which united Caesaraugusta (Zaragoza) with Asturica Augusta"  (Astorga).
Medieval source of La rana'' ("The Frog")
Two Roman milliarium are exposed in a public garden next to the Church. They were used during the Middle Ages to lay the foundations of a bridge. Arancón can be considered the milliarium capital in Soria. After the church there are another two milliarium.
Asunción romanesque church (Arancón)
Concepción church (Omeñaca)
Saint Bartholomew hermitage ruins

Economy

Culture of wheat, rye, barley and sunflower
Sheep cattle and pasture rent
Greater hunting boundary

Flora and fauna
Flora includes holm-oak, rivets, steppe, tea, camomile, heather and lavender

Wildlife include wild boar, red deer, roe deer, rabbit, hare and partridge

References

Municipalities in the Province of Soria